A list of rivers of Hesse, Germany:

A
Aar, tributary of the Dill
Aar, tributary of the Lahn
Aar, tributary of the Twiste
Aarbach
Affhöllerbach
Ahlersbach, tributary of the Kinzig in Schlüchtern-Herolz
Ahlersbach, tributary of the Kinzig in Schlüchtern-Niederzell
Ahne
Aitzenbach
Albach
Allna
Altefeld
Ansbach
Antrift
Arnsbach
Äschersbach
Aselbach
Asphe
Aubach, tributary of the Aar
Aubach, tributary of the Dill
Auer
Auerbach
Augraben
Aula

B
Bach an dem Margrund
Bach an dem Schreinersgrund
Bach an dem Seegrund
Bach an der Frohndelle
Bach an der Kniewiese
Bach von dem Kohl
Bach von dem Vierstöck
Bach von den Rehwiesen
Bach von der Dickhecke
Bauna
Bebra
Beerbach, tributary of the Mergbach
Beerbach, tributary of the Modau
Beise
Bentreff
Benzenbach
Berfa
Bettenbach
Bieber, tributary of the Haune
Bieber, tributary of the Kinzig
Bieber, tributary of the Lahn
Bieber, tributary of the Rodau
Bierbach
Birkigsbach
Bizzenbach
Bleichenbach
Boxbach
Bracht
Braubach
Brechelser Floß
Brensbach
Brombach

C
Calenberger Bach
Crumbach

D
Darmbach
Dase
Dautphe
Detzelbach
Deutergraben
Diemel
Dießenbach
Diete
Dietzhölze
Dill
Dilsbach
Dittenbach
Döllbach
Dombach
Dornbach
Dorndorfer Bach
Drusel
Dünsbergbach
Dusebach

E
Eberbach
Eckelsbach
Edelbach
Eder
Efze
Eggel
Eichbach
Eichelbach, tributary of the Nidda
Eichelbach, tributary of the Weil
Eifa
Eisenbach
Eitra
Elbbach
Elbe
Elmbach
Elnhauser Wasser
Elsoff
Ems
Emsbach
Engelbach
Erbesbach
Erdbach
Erlenbach, tributary of the Hillersbach
Erlenbach, tributary of the Nidda
Erlenbach, tributary of the Nidder
Ernstbach
Erpe
Erzbach
Eschbach, tributary of the Nidda
Eschbach, tributary of the Usa
Espe
Esse
Essebach

F
Fahrenbach
Fallbach
Fauerbach
Felda
Finkenbach
Fischbach
Fliede
Flörsbach
Forbach
Formbach
Frieda
Frohnbach
Fulda

G
Gansbach, tributary of the Perf
Gänsbach, headstreams of the Merkenfritzerbach
Geilebach
Geisbach
Gelster
Geringsgraben
Gers
Gersprenz
Gierbach
Giesel
Gilgbach
Gilsa
Gimbach
Glisborn
Goldbach, tributary of the Eder
Goldbach, tributary of the Ems
Gräbenackers Bach
Graswiesenbach
Grenff
Grennelbach
Grenzebach
Gresel
Grom-Bach
Gronau
Gründau
Grundbach
Grundelbach
Grunnelbach
Gundbach
Güttersbach

H
Hainbach, tributary of the Main
Hainbach, tributary of the Usa
Hältersbach
Hardwasser
Hasel, tributary of the Haune
Hasel, tributary of the Orb
Haselbach
Haune
Häuserbach
Heegbrückerbach
Heller
Hellgraben
Herfabach
Hillersbach
Hirschbach
Hirtenbach
Hohensteinerbach
Hohlbach
Höllerbach
Hollerbach
Hollerbornbach
Hollergraben
Holzape
Holzbach, tributary of the Diemel
Holzbach, tributary of the Elbbach
Holzbach, tributary of the Schweinfe
Holzbach, tributary of the Usa
Holzgraben
Holzkape
Hoppecke
Horloff
Hosbach

I
Ibra
Ilsbach
Irrbach
Itter, tributary of the Diemel
Itter, tributary of the Eder
Itter, tributary of the Neckar

J
Josbach
Jossa, tributary of the Fulda
Jossa, tributary of the Lüder
Jossa, tributary of the Sinn
Jungfernbach, tributary of the Ahne
Jungfernbach, tributary of the Esse

K
Kahl
Kainsbach
Kalbach
Kälberbach
Kaltes Wasser
Käsbach
Kehrenbach
Kelster
Kemmete
Kerkerbach
Kieselbach
Kilsbach
Kinzig, tributary of the Main
Kinzig, tributary of the Mümling
Kirchbach
Kittelbach
Kleebach
Klein
Kleppe
Klingbach
Klingebach
Kohlbach
Krebsbach, tributary of the Fallbach
Krebsbach, tributary of the Nidder
Küh-Bach
Kuhbach
Kumpgraben
Kupferbach

L
Lache
Lahn
Laisbach
Langenbach
Langendernbach
Lasterbach
Laubach
Laubersbach
Laubusbach
Lauchbach
Laudenauer Bach
Laudenbach
Läunsbach
Lauter
Lauter, tributary of the Schlitz
Lauter, tributary of the Wetter
Laxbach
Leimbach
Lembach
Lemp
Lempe
Liederbach
Limeckebach
Linspherbach
Lohbach
Lohr
Lohrbach
Losse
Lüder
Luderbach
Lumda
Lütter

M
Main
Männerwasser
Marbach
Marbeck
Matzbach
Matzoff
Meiereibach
Mergbach
Merkenfritzerbach
Merrebach
Michelbach, tributary of the Gersprenz
Michelbach, tributary of the Nidda
Michelbach, tributary of the Usa
Modau
Molsberger Bach
Monzenbach
Mühlbach, tributary of the Elbbach
Mühlbach, tributary of the Merkenfritzerbach
Mühlbach, tributary of the Schwarzbach
Mühlenwasser
Mülmisch
Mümling
Mutterbach

N
Näßlichbach
Nebelbeeke
Neckar
Neerdar
Nemphe
Netze
Nidda
Nidder
Nieste
Norde
Nuhne
Nüst

O
Ocherbach
Oderbach
Ohe
Ohebach, tributary of the Efze
Ohebach, tributary of the Kehrenbach
Ohm
Olfe
Olmes
Orb
Orke
Orpe
Osterbach, tributary of the Eder
Osterbach, tributary of the Fulda
Osterbach, headwater of the Gersprenz

P
Palmbach
Perf
Pfieffe
Pflaumbach (upper course of the Welzbach)

Pilgerbach

R
Ramholzer Wasser
Reichenbach
Reiherbach
Rhine
Rhena
Rhene
Rhünda
Riedbach
Rinnebach
Rodau
Röderbach
Rohrbach, tributary of the Fulda
Rohrbach, tributary of the Osterbach
Röllbach
Rombach
Rosbach
Rotes Wasser
Ruhrbach

S
Salz
Salzbach, tributary of the Elbbach
Salzbach, tributary of the Nidda
Salzbach, tributary of the Seemenbach
Salzbach, tributary of the Rhine at Wiesbaden
Salzböde
Sauerbornsbach
Saurode
Schaubach
Schelde
Schellenbach
Schemmerbach
Schifflache
Schleichenbach
Schleiersbach
Schlichenbach
Schlitz
Schlüsselgrund
Schmale Sinn
Schmalnau
Schmiehbach
Schnepfenbach
Schorbach
Schwalbach
Schwalm
Schwarzbach, tributary of the Elmbach
Schwarzbach, tributary of the Main
Schwarzbach of the Hessian Ried, tributary of the Rhine
Schweinfe
Schwingbach
Schwülme
Seebach
Seemenbach
Seenbach
Seifenbach
Selzenbach
Seulbach
Siegbach
Sinn
Solmsbach
Solz, tributary of the Fulda near Bebra, downstream of the other Solz
Solz, tributary of the Fulda near Bad Hersfeld, upstream of the other Solz
Sontra
Soode
Spießbach, tributary of the Nidder
Spießbach, tributary of the Sauer
Spolebach
Steina
Steinach
Steinbach, tributary of the Gersprenz
Steinbach, tributary of the Nidda
Steinebach
Stierbach
Stockheimer Bach
Straßbach
Strupbach
Suhl
Sulzbach

T
Taft
Thalheimer Bach
Thiele
Tiefenbach
Treisbach, tributary of the Gilsa
Treisbach, tributary of the Wetschaft
Twiste

U
Ulfa
Ulfe, tributary of the Fulda
Ulfe, tributary of the Sontra
Ulfenbach
Ulmbach, tributary of the Kinzig
Ulmbach, tributary of the Lahn
Ulster
Urff
Urselbach
Usa

V
Vers
Vierbach
Villbach
Vockebach
Vogelthal-Bach

W
Wahlebach
Waldbach
Walgerbach
Walluf
Wande
Warme
Watter
Watzenbach
Wehrbach
Wehre
Weid
Weihe
Weil
Weilbach
Weissbach
Welzbach (upper course Pflaumbach)
Wembach
Wenkbach
Werbe
Werra
Weschnitz
Wesebach
Weser
Wetschaft
Wetter
Wickerbach
Wiehoff
Wiera
Wiesbach, tributary of the Usa
Wiesbach, tributary of the Weil
Wiesbüttgraben
Wieseck
Wilde
Wilde Aa
Windbach
Wisper
Wohra
Wolfsbach
Wolfshainer Bach
Wörsbach
Wünschbach

Z
Zahlbach
Zwester Ohm

 
Hesse-related lists
Hes